Aberdour House is  Category A listed country house in New Aberdour, Aberdeenshire, Scotland. Dating to around 1740, it was built by John Forbes, of Knappernay.

Historian Charles McKean describes House of Memsie as a "smaller and more decorative version of Aberdour House".

See also
List of listed buildings in Aberdeenshire

References

External links
 Aberdour House - Historic Environment Scotland
 Aberdour House - Canmore.org.uk

Category A listed buildings in Aberdeenshire
Buildings and structures in New Aberdour
Country houses in Aberdeenshire